The Kentucky Public Radio (KPR) is a consortium of four public radio stations: WFPL (Louisville Public Media), WKMS (Murray), WKYU (Bowling Green), WEKU (Richmond/Lexington).

The primary mission of Kentucky Public Radio is to facilitate content sharing among stations and the hiring and management of a Statehouse Reporter.

KPRN is managed by board of directors composed of the individual station managers. 

In January, 2015 Ryland Barton was named the State Capital Bureau Chief in Frankfort, Kentucky.

Affiliates

References

External links
Official website

NPR member networks